Gary W King (September 4, 1947 – July 23, 2003) was an American jazz bassist. He was born in Middletown, New York.

King appeared on many albums released by CTI Records, especially those by Bob James, and later on James' own album label Tappan Zee Records. He also played bass on a number of albums by Gato Barbieri, Roberta Flack, Grover Washington Jr., and on The Jacksons' album Destiny, notably the track "Blame It on the Boogie".

Discography

With Gene McDaniels

 Headless Heroes of the Apocolypse (Atlantic, 1971)

With George Benson

 Bodytalk (CTI, 1973)
 Pacific Fire (CTI, 1983)

With George Benson & Joe Farrell

 Benson & Farrell (CTI, 1976)

With Lenny Williams

 Pray for the Lion (Warner Bros, 1974)
 Big City (Nemperor, 1977)

With Alphonse Mouzon

 Funky Snakefoot (Blue Note, 1974)

With Idris Muhammad

 Power of Soul (Kudu Records, 1974)

With Esther Phillips

 Performance (Kudu Records, 1974)
 For All We Know (Kudu Records, 1976)

With Luiz Bonfá

 Manhattan Strut (Paddle Wheel, 1974)

With Bob James

 One (Columbia, 1974)
 Two (Columbia, 1975)
 Three (Columbia, 1976)
 BJ4 (Columbia, 1977)
 Heads (Tappan Zee, 1977)
 Touchdown (Columbia, 1978)
 Lucky Seven (Columbia, 1979)
 H (Tappan Zee, 1980)
 Hands Down (Columbia CBS, 1982)
 The Genie (Columbia, 1983)
 Ivory Coast (Warner Bros, 1988)

With Gladys Knight & The Pips

 2nd Anniversary (Buddah, 1975)

With Merry Clayton

 Keep Your Eye on the Sparrow (Ode, 1975)

With Grover Washington Jr.

 Mister Magic (Kudu Records, 1975)
 Feels so Good (Kudu Records, 1975)

With Hank Crawford

 Don't You Worry 'Bout a Thing (Kudu Records, 1975)
 I Hear a Symphony (Kudu Records, 1975)
 Hank Crawford's Back (Kudu Records, 1976)
 Tico Rico (Kudu Records, 1977)

With Roberta Flack

 Feel Like Making Love (Atlantic, 1975)
 Blue Lights in the Basement (Atlantic, 1977)

With Tom Scott

 New York Connection (Ode, 1975)
 Blow it Out (Ode, 1977)

With Ronnie Foster

Cheshire Cat (Blue Note, 1975)

With Eric Gale

Ginseng Woman (CBS, 1976)

With Maynard Ferguson

 Prima Scream (Columbia, 1976)
 Conquistador (Columbia, 1977)

With Hubert Laws

 Romeo and Juliet (Columbia, 1976)
 The San Francisco Concert (CTI, 1977)

With Gato Barbieri

 Caliente! (A&M 1976)
 Ruby Ruby (A&M, 1977)
 Passion and Fire (A&M 1984)

With Jeremy Steig

 Firefly (CTI, 1977)

With John Blair

 We Belong Together (CTI, 1977)

With Sonny Fortune

 Serengeti Minstrel (Atlantic, 1977)

With David Matthews

 Dune (CTI, 1977)

With Stanley Turrentine

 Nightwings (Fantasy, 1977)
 Westside Highway (Fantasy, 1978)

With Eric Mercury & Roberta Flack

 Our Love Will Stop the World (Atlantic, 1983)

With Yusef Lateef with Art Farmer

 Autophysiopsychic (CTI, 1978)

With Jimmy Owens
Headin' Home (A&M/Horizon, 1978)
With Kenny Barron

 Innocence (Wolf, 1978)

With Marc Colby

 Serpentine Fire (Tappan Zee, 1978)
 One Good Turn (Columbia, 1979)

With Nina Simone

 Baltimore (CTI, 1978)

With The Jacksons

 Destiny (Epic CBS, 1978)

With Earl Klugh & Bob James

 One on One (Columbia, 1979)
Two of a Kind (Blue Note Records, 1982)
With Wilbert Longmire

 Champagne (CBS, 1979)
 Sunny Side Up (CBS, 1979)

With Mongo Santamaría

 Red Hot (Columbia, 1979)

With Earl Klugh

 Crazy For You (Liberty, 1981)

With Luther Vandross

 Never Too Much (Epic, 1981)

With Roland Hanna

 Gershwin Carmichael Cats (CTI, 1982)

With Roger Kellaway Featuring Houston Person

 Creation (Greenestreet, 1984)

With Paul Winter & Paul Halley

 Whales Alive (Living, 1987)

With Kirk Whalum

 And You Know That! (Columbia, 1988)

With Jim Hall

 Concierto / Big Blues / Studio Trieste (BGO 2018)

References

1947 births
2003 deaths
People from Middletown, Orange County, New York
American jazz bass guitarists
American male bass guitarists
Guitarists from New York (state)
American jazz double-bassists
Male double-bassists
20th-century American bass guitarists
20th-century double-bassists
20th-century American male musicians
American male jazz musicians